Macrocoma sacra is a species of leaf beetle of Saudi Arabia and Pakistan, described by  in 1983.

References

sacra
Beetles of Asia
Insects of the Arabian Peninsula
Insects of Pakistan
Beetles described in 1983